Chiwan railway station is a former railway station on the Pingnan Railway. It opened in 1993. In 2005, Chiwan railway station was demolished to make way for a new access road into Chiwan port. The port holdings company paid out compensation of over 34 million yuan as a result of the redevelopment.

References 

Railway stations in Guangdong
Stations on the Pinghu–Nanshan Railway
Railway stations in China opened in 1993
Railway stations closed in 2005